The Bangus Valley is located in Indian Administered Jammu and Kashmir. It is situated to the West of Handwara town along the Mawri River within the Handwara sub-district. district Kupwara

Etymology
The term Bangus comes from Sanskrit word Van (Forest) and gus (grass).

Geography
The principal valley is locally known as "Boud Bangus" (Big Bangus) and has an estimated area of about 300 square kilometers. It consists of a linear elliptical bowl aligned along the east–west axis and is surrounded by Rajwar and Mawar in the east, Shamasbury and Dajlungun Mountains in the west and Chowkibal and Karnah Guli in the north. A smaller  valley known as "Lokut Bangus" (Small Bangus) lies on the north-eastern side of the main valley. Lashar valley is from North side of boud bangus and bidrun Top is favourite destination for trekkers.
There are three routes to visit this place. The least distance route from Handwara via Reshwari Mawer. The second route is also from Handwara but via Rajwar and is suitable for trekking only. The third route from Kupwara via Chowkibal.

The valley is  traversed by many small streams with nearly 14 tributaries, including the Roshan Kul, Tillwan Kul and Douda Kul. The water of these streams form one of the headwaters of the Kamil River which in turn joins the Lolab stream, thus forming the Pohru River.

Flora and fauna
Bangus is replete with a diverse variety of flora and fauna. The meadows and the slopes of the side plateaus are covered with a range of flowers and medicinal plants. Fresh water fishes of moderate size and their fingerlings inhabit the streams. The valley's forests and plains serve as the breeding, feeding and protection grounds for many wild animal species. The wild life of includes about 50 species of animals and about 10 species of birds. The animal species include the musk deer, antelope, snow leopard, brown bear, black bear, monkeys, and red fox. A large number of residents and migratory birds can also be found feeding and breeding in the valley. The prominent resident birds include pheasants, tragopan, monal pheasant, black partridge, bush quail, and wild fowl.

Tourism
Bangus has remained largely restricted and an unfavorable tourist spot due to the armed conflict that affects this area, and also due to the lack of infrastructure. However, efforts have been made to bring the valley on the tourist map. , the road connectivity from Handwara side via Mawer is complete. People can take only small cars to Bangus because work on macadamisation is still going on. Vehicles are available on rent basis from Handwara market. Night stay tents are also available there.

References

Valleys of Jammu and Kashmir
Kupwara district